Municipal election for Butwal took place on 13 May 2022, with all 97 positions up for election across 19 wards. The electorate elected a mayor, a deputy mayor, 19 ward chairs and 76 ward members. An indirect election will also be held to elect five female members and an additional three female members from the Dalit and minority community to the municipal executive.

Khel Raj Pandey from Nepali Congress was elected as mayor of the sub-metropolitan city.

Background 

Butwal was established in 1959 as a municipality. The sub-metropolitan city was created in 2014 by incorporating neighboring village development committees into Butwal municipality. Electors in each ward elect a ward chair and four ward members, out of which two must be female and one of the two must belong to the Dalit community.

In the previous election, Shiva Raj Subedi from CPN (Unified Marxist–Leninist) was elected as mayor.

Candidates

Opinion Poll

Exit polls

Results

Mayoral election

Ward results 

|-
! colspan="2" style="text-align:centre;" | Party
! Chairman
! Members
|-
| style="background-color:;" |
| style="text-align:left;" |Nepali Congress
| style="text-align:center;" | 12
| style="text-align:center;" | 53
|-
| style="background-color:;" |
| style="text-align:left;" |CPN (Unified Marxist-Leninist)
| style="text-align:center;" | 5
| style="text-align:center;" | 22
|-
| style="background-color:;" |
| style="text-align:left;" |CPN (Unified Socialist)
| style="text-align:center;" | 1
| style="text-align:center;" | 0
|-
| style="background-color:;" |
| style="text-align:left;" |Rastriya Janamukti Party
| style="text-align:center;" | 0
| style="text-align:center;" | 1
|-
| style="background-color:;" |
| style="text-align:left;" |Independent
| style="text-align:center;" | 1
| style="text-align:center;" | 0
|-
! colspan="2" style="text-align:right;" | Total
! 19
! 76
|}

Summary of Results by ward

Council formation

See also 

 2022 Nepalese local elections
 2022 Lalitpur municipal election
 2022 Kathmandu municipal election
 2022 Janakpur municipal election
 2022 Pokhara municipal election

References

Butwal